James Richard Akerman (born October 1956) is an American geographer, director of the Newberry Library's Hermon Dunlap Smith Center for the History of Cartography. At the Newberry he serves as Curator of Maps. He is known for his work on the history of cartography.

Akerman obtained his B.A.in Sociology from Denison University in 1978, his M.A. in Geography from the University of Michigan in 1981 and his Ph.D. also in Geography from Pennsylvania State University in 1991. 

In 1985 Akerman started at the Newberry Library as acting and assistant curator of maps. In 1988 he became Assistant
Director and in 1995 Acting Director. Since 1996 he has been director of the Hermon Dunlap Smith Center for the History of
Cartography.

Selected publications 
 Akerman, James R., and Karrow, Robert W., eds., Maps: Finding Our Place in the World, Chicago, IL: University of Chicago Press. 2007.
 Akerman, James R., ed. The imperial map: cartography and the mastery of empire. Vol. 15. University of Chicago Press, 2009.
 Akerman, James R., ed.  Decolonizing the Map: Cartography from Colony to Nation. Chicago: University of Chicago Press, 2017.

References

External links 
 Material Maps in the Digital Age, The Newberry Library faculty 2019

1956 births
Living people
American geographers
Information visualization experts
Denison University alumni
University of Michigan College of Literature, Science, and the Arts alumni
Penn State College of Earth and Mineral Sciences alumni